Robert Wayne Morton (March 23, 1937 – December 7, 2002) was a Royal Canadian Air Force officer. He served as deputy commander of NORAD from 1989 to 1992.

References

Canadian Forces Air Command generals
1937 births
2002 deaths
People from Almonte, Ontario
Canadian military personnel from Ontario